The 2001 Nordic Tournament was the fourth edition and took place in Falun, Trondheim and Oslo between 7–11 March 2000.

Results

Overall

References

External links
Official website 

2001 in ski jumping
Nordic Tournament